Hartford N. Gunn Jr. (1927- January 2, 1986) was the founding President of the Public Broadcasting Service (PBS).

Early life
Gunn was born in 1927 in Port Washington, New York.

Career
In 1969 as manager of WGBH-TV, Gunn invited Fred Rogers to accompany him and testify before the Senate Subcommittee on Communications in support of the full funding of the Corporation for Public Broadcasting.

In 1970 he was chosen as the first president of the Public Broadcasting Service, at least in part due to his “widely acknowledged success in the 1960s at the Boston television station WGBH.”  At the time he started (after receiving an MBA at the Harvard Business School in 1951), WGBH was an FM radio station.  He helped it add the television station there and became the general manager. (Note: The LA Times reported he started in 1952, a year after he graduated)

Gunn became vice-chairman of PBS in 1976.  He was general manager of KCET, (at the time it was the public TV station in Los Angeles) from 1979 until 1983. Before his death he worked as a public television consultant in Annapolis, Maryland where he had lived.

Death
On January 2, 1986, Gunn died of cancer at Massachusetts General Hospital at the age of 59. He was survived by his mother Edith Arnold Gunn of Glen Cove and his cousin Dr. Albert E. Gunn of Houston.

See also
 Ralph B. Rogers

References

Harvard Business School alumni
Deaths from cancer in Massachusetts
People from Port Washington, New York
People from Annapolis, Maryland
PBS people
WGBH Educational Foundation
1927 births
1986 deaths